The Boston College Law Review is an academic journal of legal scholarship and a student organization at Boston College Law School. It was established in 1959. Until 1977, it was known as the Boston College Industrial & Commercial Law Review. Among student-edited general-interest law reviews, it is currently ranked 22nd in the Washington and Lee School of Law Law Journal Rankings.

The journal publishes eight issues each year (plus an online-only issue, known as the E. Supp., that provides commentary on recent en banc and other significant federal circuit court decisions). Each print issue typically includes four or five articles concerning legal issues of national interest written by outside authors, as well as several student-written notes. The journal has published articles on such wide-ranging topics as the legal issues involved in managing the lives of ex-offenders, the compensation of fund managers in the mutual fund industry, and the contributions of interdisciplinary evidence scholarship. The journal also hosts symposia from time to time and publishes the resulting scholarship.

The journal is staffed by approximately 50 second- and 50 third-year law students. Staff positions are filled by students who either attain the top five grades in each first-year section, who score highest in the first-year writing competition, or a combination of these two criteria.

Notable articles

References

External links 
 

American law journals
Publications established in 1959
Boston College
General law journals
Law journals edited by students
English-language journals
8 times per year journals
Magazines published in Boston